The First Continental Congress was a meeting of delegates from 12 of the 13 British colonies that became the United States. It met from September 5 to October 26, 1774, at Carpenters' Hall in Philadelphia, Pennsylvania, after the British Navy instituted a blockade of Boston Harbor and the Parliament of Great Britain passed the punitive Intolerable Acts in response to the December 1773 Boston Tea Party. During the opening weeks of the Congress, the delegates conducted a spirited discussion about how the colonies could collectively respond to the British government's coercive actions, and they worked to make a common cause. 

As a prelude to its decisions, the Congress's first action was the adoption of the Suffolk Resolves, a measure drawn up by several counties in Massachusetts that included a declaration of grievances, called for a trade boycott of British goods, and urged each colony to set up and train its own militia. A less radical plan was then proposed to create a Union of Great Britain and the Colonies, but the delegates tabled the measure and later struck it from the record of their proceedings. They then agreed on a Declaration and Resolves that included the Continental Association, a proposal for an embargo on British trade. They also drew up a Petition to the King pleading for redress of their grievances and repeal of the Intolerable Acts. That appeal had no effect, so the colonies convened the Second Continental Congress the following May, shortly after the battles of Lexington and Concord, to organize the defense of the colonies at the outset of the Revolutionary War.

Convention
The Congress met from September 5 to October 26, 1774, in Carpenters' Hall in Philadelphia; delegates from 12 British colonies participated. They were elected by the people of the various colonies, the colonial legislature, or by the Committee of Correspondence of a colony. Loyalist sentiments outweighed Patriot views in Georgia, and that colony did not join the cause until the following year.

Peyton Randolph was elected as president of the Congress on the opening day, and he served through October 22 when ill health forced him to retire, and Henry Middleton was elected in his place for the balance of the session. Charles Thomson, leader of the Philadelphia Committee of Correspondence, was selected as the congressional secretary. The rules adopted by the delegates were designed to guard the equality of participants and to promote free-flowing debate. 

As the deliberations progressed, it became clear that those in attendance were not of one mind concerning why they were there. Conservatives such as Joseph Galloway, John Dickinson, John Jay, and Edward Rutledge believed their task to be forging policies to pressure Parliament to rescind its unreasonable acts. Their ultimate goal was to develop a reasonable solution to the difficulties and bring about reconciliation between the Colonies and Great Britain.  Others such as Patrick Henry, Roger Sherman, Samuel Adams, and John Adams believed their task to be developing a decisive statement of the rights and liberties of the Colonies.  Their ultimate goal was to end what they felt to be the abuses of parliamentary authority and to retain their rights, which had been guaranteed under Colonial charters and the English constitution.

Roger Sherman denied the legislative authority of Parliament, and Patrick Henry believed that the Congress needed to develop a completely new system of government, independent from Great Britain, for the existing Colonial governments were already dissolved. In contrast to these ideas, Joseph Galloway put forward a "Plan of Union" which suggested that an American legislative body should be formed with some authority, whose consent would be required for imperial measures.

Declaration and Resolves
In the end, the voices of compromise carried the day. Rather than calling for independence, the First Continental Congress passed and signed the Continental Association in its Declaration and Resolves, which called for a boycott of British goods to take effect in December 1774. After Congress signed on October 20, 1774 embracing non exportation they also planned nonimportation of slaves beginning December 1, which would have abolished the slave trade in the United States of America 33 years before it actually ended.

Accomplishments
The primary accomplishment of the First Continental Congress was a compact among the colonies to boycott British goods beginning on December 1, 1774, unless parliament should rescind the Intolerable Acts. While delegates convened in the First Continental Congress, fifty-one women in Edenton, North Carolina formed their own association (now referred to as the Edenton Tea Party) in response to the Intolerable Acts that focused on producing goods for the colonies. Additionally, Great Britain's colonies in the West Indies were threatened with a boycott unless they agreed to non-importation of British goods. Imports from Britain dropped by 97 percent in 1775, compared with the previous year. Committees of observation and inspection were to be formed in each Colony to ensure compliance with the boycott. It was further agreed that if the Intolerable Acts were not repealed, the colonies would also cease exports to Britain after September 10, 1775.

The Houses of Assembly of each participating colony approved the proceedings of the Congress, with the exception of New York. The boycott was successfully implemented, but its potential for altering British colonial policy was cut off by the outbreak of hostilities in April 1775.

Congress also voted to meet again the following year if their grievances were not addressed satisfactorily. Anticipating that there would be cause to convene a second congress, delegates resolved to send letters of invitation to those colonies that had not joined them in Philadelphia, including: Quebec, Saint John's Island, Nova Scotia, Georgia, East Florida, and West Florida. Of these, only Georgia would ultimately send delegates to the next Congress.

List of delegates

Gallery

See also
 American Revolutionary War#Prelude to revolution
 Founding Fathers of the United States
 List of delegates to the Continental Congress
 Journals of the Continental Congress

Notes

References

Sources
 Bancroft, George. History of the United States of America, from the discovery of the American continent. (1854–78), vol 4–10 online edition
 
 
 Launitz-Schurer, Loyal Whigs and Revolutionaries, The making of the revolution in New York, 1765-1776, 1980, 
 Ketchum, Richard, Divided Loyalties, How the American Revolution came to New York, 2002, 
 Miller, John C. Origins of the American Revolution (1943) online edition
 Puls, Mark, Samuel Adams, father of the American Revolution, 2006, 
 
 Peter Force, ed. American Archives, 9 vol 1837–1853, major compilation of documents 1774–1776. online edition

External links
 
 
  Full text of Journals of the Continental Congress, 1774–1789Letters of Delegates to Congress, 1774–1789

1774 in the Thirteen Colonies

Continental, first
18th century in Philadelphia
Pennsylvania in the American Revolution
1774 in Pennsylvania